Nikolaos Zalikas (born 9 April 1962) is a Greek professional football manager.

References

1962 births
Living people
Greek football managers
PAOK FC managers
Apollon Pontou FC managers
PAS Lamia 1964 managers
Panserraikos F.C. managers
Niki Volos F.C. managers
Kavala F.C. managers
Anagennisi Giannitsa F.C. managers
Pierikos F.C. managers
Kalamata F.C. managers
Sportspeople from Katerini